Charles-Gaspard Tarieu de Lanaudière (September 9, 1769 – June 7, 1812) was a seigneur and political figure in Lower Canada.

He was born Charles Tarieu de La Naudière in Quebec City in 1769, the son of seigneur Charles-François Tarieu de La Naudière, and studied at London. He inherited the seigneury of Saint-Vallier from his father. He was a lieutenant in the Royal Canadian Volunteer Regiment and also served as lieutenant-colonel in the local militia during the War of 1812. In 1792, he married Suzanne-Antoinette, the daughter of Pierre-Paul Margane de Lavaltrie. Lanaudière was elected to the Legislative Assembly of Lower Canada for Warwick in 1796. In 1804, he was elected in Leinster and he was named to the Legislative Council in 1811. He died at Lavaltrie while still in office in 1812.

His half-brother Charles-Louis also served on the legislative council. His daughter Charlotte married Barthélemy Joliette, and his sister Marie-Anne married François Baby.

External links

Charles-Gaspard
1769 births
1812 deaths
Politicians from Quebec City
Members of the Legislative Assembly of Lower Canada
Members of the Legislative Council of Lower Canada